Kuurne–Brussels–Kuurne is an annual single-day road cycling race in Belgium. It is held one day after Omloop Het Nieuwsblad, on the last Sunday of February or the first of March, and completes the opening weekend of the Belgian cycling season. It is ranked a 1.HC event of the UCI Europe Tour. Tom Boonen holds the most wins with three victories.

History

Early editions
First held in 1946, the race was run from Kuurne, a small town known for its textile industry, to the Belgian capital of Brussels and back. In the 1950s it served as the opening race of the Belgian cycling season. When Brussels was becoming inaccessible for a cycling event in the late 1960s, the race was rerouted towards the Flemish Ardennes and renamed "Omloop der beide Vlaanderen" ("Circuit of both Flanders"). In 1979 organizers decided to rename the event to Kuurne–Brussels–Kuurne nonetheless.

Opening weekend
For many decades, Kuurne–Brussels–Kuurne serves as the second race of the opening weekend in Belgium, after Omloop Het Nieuwsblad on Saturday, as well as the first weekend of racing in Northwestern Europe. Although second after the Omloop, and considered the smaller of the two events, it holds significant prestige because of its calendar date. Since 2005 it is included in the UCI Europe Tour; in 2016 it was upgraded to a 1.HC event, the same ranking as Omloop Het Nieuwsblad, but Omloop was upgraded to UCI World Tour level in 2017. Despite tandeming with Omloop Het Nieuwsblad, no rider has ever won the Omloop and Kuurne–Brussels–Kuurne on the same weekend.

Winter race
As it is run in late winter, Kuurne–Brussels–Kuurne has often been affected by poor weather. The race had to be cancelled three times because of snow or frost – in 1986, 1993 and 2013. The 2010 event was run in extreme weather as the remnants of cyclone Xynthia hit Belgium, with strong winds and torrential rain ravaging the peloton. The race had to be shortened by 20 km because a fallen tree obstructed the road. The edition was won by Dutch outsider Bobbie Traksel; only 26 of 195 riders finished the race. In 2004 Kuurne served as the opening race of the season, after Omloop Het Nieuwsblad was cancelled because of snow, before thaw set in on the night before the Sunday race.

Route

Despite its name, the route does not actually extend to Brussels. The race starts on the hippodrome of Kuurne, in the south of West Flanders, before heading east in the direction of Brussels, but its easternmost point is somewhere near Ninove, 23 km west of Brussels. After the turning point, the race addresses the Flemish Ardennes where a number of hills feature, before finishing in Kuurne after approximately 200 km. The route in the hill zone changes every year, but some of the regular climbs include Edelareberg, La Houppe, Kanarieberg, Kruisberg, Oude Kwaremont, Tiegemberg and Nokereberg.

With a long and flat run-in to the finish, the course is less selective than the Omloop Het Nieuwsblad. The race ends with two local laps around Kortrijk and Kuurne. With the last climb of the race coming at 53 km from the finish, Kuurne–Brussels–Kuurne has established itself as something of a sprinters’ classic.

List of winners

Winners by nationality

Junior race
A junior version of the race has been held since 2000.

Winners

Notes

References

External links
 

 
Cycle races in Belgium
UCI Europe Tour races
Recurring sporting events established in 1945
1945 establishments in Belgium
Sport in Brussels
Annual sporting events in Belgium